Fabrice Pierre Begeorgi Cabezas (born 20 April 1987) is a French association football defender who plays as a left-back for ES Fos.

Career
Begeorgi played for French lower league sides FC Libourne-Saint-Seurin and Amiens SC as well as for German 2. Bundesliga side TuS Koblenz in loan deals. In January 2009 he joined the third division reserve team of SV Werder Bremen on loan. He returned to Marseille on 30 June 2009.

On 21 June 2010, the attacking midfielder of FC Istres signed a two-year deal with AC Ajaccio. Begeorgi made his Ligue 2 debut on 3 October 2014 after being loaned in the 2013–14 season. His debut came against Niortais at the Stade Francois Coty.

References

External links
 
 

1987 births
Living people
People from Martigues
Sportspeople from Bouches-du-Rhône
French footballers
Association football fullbacks
Liga I players
Olympique de Marseille players
FC Libourne players
Amiens SC players
FC Istres players
AC Ajaccio players
FC Petrolul Ploiești players
ES Uzès Pont du Gard players
TuS Koblenz players
SV Werder Bremen II players
UE Engordany players
US Pontet Grand Avignon 84 players
UE Sant Julià players
Ligue 1 players
Ligue 2 players
2. Bundesliga players
3. Liga players
French expatriate footballers
French expatriate sportspeople in Germany
Expatriate footballers in Germany
French expatriate sportspeople in Romania
Expatriate footballers in Romania
French expatriate sportspeople in Andorra
Expatriate footballers in Andorra
Footballers from Provence-Alpes-Côte d'Azur